Maryann McConnell is a Canadian snooker and pool player. She was runner-up in the 1984 Professional World Women's Snooker Championship, and has won numerous pool tournaments in Canada.

Biography
McConnell started playing at the age of 24, at the University of Guelph in Ontario where she studied from 1974 to 1980. She later drove daily to a pool hall in nearby Kitchener, where she played snooker, practicing for as much as eight hours a day.

In 1980, 1981 and 1983, she was a quarter-finalist in the World Women's Snooker Championship. For 1984, separate amateur and professional events were staged. McConnell entered the professional event, and reached the final, losing 2–4 to Mandy Fisher. At one time, McConnell was the second-ranked woman player.

She was the runner-up in the 1984 National Express Grand Prix ladies snooker series, and spent the summer of 1985 living in Saudi Arabia.

In 1991 she took part in the 1991 World Masters, losing in her first matches in both the women's singles, and the women's doubles (with J. Page). In the mixed doubles she fared slightly better, partnering Alain Robidoux to wins over Neal Foulds and J. Page, and over seeded Terry Griffiths and Mandy Fisher, before losing to James Wattana and S. Smith.

In 1992 she beat Sherri Richardson 4–2 in the semi-final, and Rhondda Jackman in the final to win the Canadian Women's Championship, retaining the title that she had won at the previous staging in 1983.

McConnell has a degree in fine art, and runs a pool hall, Alberni Valley Billiards. She has four children. Her late husband Robin Woodward died in 2013, and had worked with McConnell managing the business.

Titles and achievements
Snooker
1983 Canadian Women's Champion
1984 Professional World Women's Snooker Championship runner-up.
1984 National Express Ladies Grand Prix runner-up
1992 Canadian Women's Champion
1997 Canadian Women's Champion
Canadian Women's Championship runner-up 1998, 1999, 2000, 2001, 2002, 2004, 2005

Nine-ball Pool
1997 Canadian Women's Nine-ball Champion
2004 Canadian Women's Nine-ball Championship runner-up
2010 Canadian Women's Nine-ball Championship runner-up
2011 Canadian Women's Nine-ball Champion
2013 Canadian Women's Nine-ball Championship runner-up
2016 Canadian Women's Nine-ball Champion

Eight-Ball Pool
2004 Billiards Congress of America amateur Seniors Eight-ball champion
2010 Canadian Women's Eight-ball Champion
2013 Canadian Women's Eight-ball Champion
2016 Canadian Women's Eight-ball Championship runner-up
British Columbia Eight-ball Women's Champion 2006, 2007, 2008, 2010, 2011, 2012, 2013, 2017, 2018
Western Canada Eight-ball Women's Champion 2009, 2011, 2013, 2017. (Runner-up 2006, 2007, 2016)

Scotch Doubles (Pool)
2012 Canadian  runner-up (with Wayne Dwyer)
2015 Canadian  runner-up (with Wayne Dwyer)
2016 Canadian  Champion (with Wayne Dwyer)

References

External links
McConnell in 1985
Canadian Billiards and Snooker Association – past champions.
Canadian Cue Sports – past champions.

Living people
Canadian snooker players
Female snooker players
Canadian pool players
Female pool players
Year of birth missing (living people)
University of Guelph alumni